The Global Monitoring Report was a joint World Bank and International Monetary Fund report that monitored how the world is doing in implementing the policies and actions for achieving the Millennium Development Goals (MDGs) and related development outcomes. Published annually since 2006, the report was discontinued in 2016.

Poverty forecasts 
The October 2015 report notes that just over 900 million people (12.8 percent of the world population) were living in extreme poverty (less than $1.90 a day) in 2012, compared with 987 million (14.2 percent of the world population) in 2011. It also projects that by 2015 less than 10% of the world's population will fall under the poverty line.

The October 2015 report revised the official poverty line to $1.90 a day, from $1.25 previously.

The following tables show that Sub-Saharan Africa has the highest percentage of extreme poverty, with 42.6% of its population living below $1.90 a day. Poverty rates are projected to decline in this region through 2030, but remain at very high levels.

Table notes and sources.

The World Bank forecasts receive extensive media coverage.

See also
 World Economic Outlook (a similar IMF publication)

References

External links
Global Monitoring Report -- website
Global Monitoring Report -- October 2015 report (PDF)

World Bank Group
Economics publications
Economic forecasting